The Guenter Loeser Memorial Award was first established in 1955 at the Air Force Cambridge Research Laboratory. It was named after Dr. Loeser, a meteorologist who lost his life while conducting a field experiment. Over time, AFCRL became the Air Force Geophysics Laboratory at Hanscom Air Force Base and has now become the Air Force Research Laboratory Space Vehicles Directorate Battlespace Environment Laboratory, AFRL/RVB, at Kirtland Air Force Base.

The award is presented annually by the Air Force Research Laboratory (at Kirtland Air Force Base since 2011) for an outstanding research contribution. Recipients present a lecture on a topic of scientific interest.

Winners

See also

 List of geophysics awards

References

AFGL Chronology - Defense Technical Information Center
AGU Will Present Edmond M. Dewan Scholarship
Prairie Wind: In Nowheresville, Nebraska, the Air Force learned a thing or two about turbulence. - Smithsonian Air & Space Magazine

Bibliography

 Chronology: From the Air Force Geophysics Laboratory to the Geophysics Directorate, Phillips Laboratory, 1985–1995; Ruth P. Liebowitz, Evelyn M. Kindler, 26 September 1995. Phillips Laboratory Special Reports, No. 275. PL-TR-95-2134.

Geophysics awards